From the International League's foundation in 1912, many of its teams relocated, changed names, transferred to different leagues, or ceased operations altogether. For the 2021 season, the league operated as the Triple-A East before switching back to its previous moniker in 2022.

Teams

Map

See also

List of American Association (1902–1997) teams
List of Pacific Coast League teams

References

External links

 
 
International League teams
International League